Välgi Nature Reserve is a nature reserve which is located in Tartu County, Estonia.

The area of the nature reserve is 762 ha.

The protected area was founded in 2006 to protect valuable habitat types and threatened species in Välgi, Alajõe, Mustametsa, Pilpaküla and Särgla village (all in former Vara Parish).

References

Nature reserves in Estonia
Geography of Tartu County